Hartfordbridge is a small village in the Hart District of Hampshire, England. The village sits on the A30 road and is 2 miles (2.5 km) from Hartley Wintney.

External links
 An engraving of Hartford Bridge, circa 1838. Hampshire: its past and present condition and future prospects by Robert Mudie 1838

Villages in Hampshire